USS Sirocco (PC-6) is the sixth  of the U.S. Navy. Sirocco was laid down 20 June 1992 by Bollinger Shipyards in Lockport, Louisiana. The ship was launched 29 May 1993, and sponsored by Mrs. Kathleen Smith, wife of RADM Raymond C. Smith, Commander, Naval Special Warfare Command. She was commissioned by the Navy 11 June 1994. As of 2016, the ship was stationed in Bahrain performing coastal patrol and interdiction surveillance in the region.

History 
Sirocco is assigned to Commander Fifth Fleet through Destroyer Squadron 50 and is homeported in Manama, Kingdom of Bahrain. Seven Patrol Coastal class (PC) warships are forward deployed to the Fifth Fleet. PC ships were formerly crewed by one of 13 rotational PC crews and homeported in Joint Expeditionary Base Little Creek, Virginia.

There, under the auspices of Commander, Patrol Coastal Squadron One/Commander, Patrol Coastal (PC) Class Squadron the crews trained on five U.S. based PC hulls prior to completing a six-month deployment to the Fifth fleet. PC ships such as Sirocco complete a variety of missions that has expanded since the transfer of the ships and associated support structures in naval surface warfare. As of 2009, PC ships deployed in Bahrain primarily conducted maritime security operations in the Persian Gulf with a concentration towards anti-piracy.

In 2009, Sirocco completed phase one of a modernization program to extend the useful lives of the ships. Upgrades included new computer systems and satellite communications, as well as upgraded air conditioning systems and a Rafeal Typhoon MK38 MOD II gun weapons system replacing the previously fitted MK96 mount.

On 28 March 2016, Sirocco seized a stateless dhow in the Arabian sea. A boarding party had been dispatched to inspect the suspicious vessel and discovered it had been transporting 1,500 AK-47 assault rifles, 200 RPG launchers, and 21 .50 caliber machine guns. After receiving reports from Sirocco, the destroyer  also arrived on the scene to assist. After the weapons were seized and offloaded, the dhow and its crew were released.

On 19 June 2022, Sirocco was involved in a confrontation with patrol craft of Iran's Islamic Revolutionary Guard Corps Navy in the Strait of Hormuz. The U.S. Navy claimed that the Iranian vessels approached Sirocco and the expeditionary fast transport  at "unsafe and unprofessional" speeds and "aggressively" sailed to within 50 yards of the American vessels. Sirocco issued warnings over her loudspeaker system and fired a warning flare, and the Iranian vessels departed within an hour without further interactions.

Further reading

References

External links 

 Sirocco home page
 FAS

 

Cyclone-class patrol ships
Ships built in Lockport, Louisiana
1993 ships